Wykeham may refer to:

Places

Current settlements
Wykeham, Ryedale, North Yorkshire, England
Wykeham, Scarborough, North Yorkshire, England
Wykeham railway station
Wykeham Township, Todd County, Minnesota, U.S.

Deserted medieval villages
East Wykeham, Ludford, Lincolnshire
West Wykeham, Ludford, Lincolnshire
Wykeham, Nettleton, Lincolnshire
Wykeham, Weston, Lincolnshire

People
William of Wykeham (1320/4–1404), English bishop and chancellor 
Peter Wykeham (1915–1995), Second World War flying ace
Wykeham McNeill (born 1957), Jamaican politician
Wykeham Leigh Pemberton (1833–1918), British Army officer

Other uses
The Wykeham Collegiate, private girls' school in Pietermaritzburg, South Africa

See also

Wickham (disambiguation)
Wycombe (disambiguation)
Winchester College, whose pupils are known as Wykehamists